Uglentsevo is a rural locality (a village) in Pertsevskoye Rural Settlement, Gryazovetsky District, Vologda Oblast, Russia. The population was 28 as of 2002.

Geography 
Uglentsevo is located 27 km southeast of Gryazovets (the district's administrative centre) by road. Zhernokovo is the nearest rural locality.

References 

Rural localities in Gryazovetsky District